Sunja is a river in central Croatia, a right tributary of Sava.

Sunja rises in the mountainous forested areas of Zrinska Gora, south of the village of Lovča. It flows northward until it turns southeast at Komogovina, and then north again near Majur. It turns east at the eponymous village of Sunja and continues through Lonjsko Polje until it merges into the Sava east of Krapje.

It's been suggested that the names "Sava", "Sunja" and "Sutla" are related, but this is uncertain.

References

Rivers of Croatia
Landforms of Sisak-Moslavina County